Una vacanza bestiale is a 1980 Italian comedy film directed by Carlo Vanzina.

Cast
Jerry Calà as Guido
Franco Oppini as Livio Zanon
Nini Salerno as Frustalupi
Umberto Smaila as Eros Castiglioni
Diego Abatantuono as Galeazzo
Teo Teocoli as the Moroccan
Lorella Morlotti as th tourist

References

External links

1980 films
Films directed by Carlo Vanzina
1980s Italian-language films
1980 comedy films
Italian comedy films
1980s Italian films